Gower is a constituency created in 1885 and represented in the House of Commons of the UK Parliament by one Member of Parliament (MP).  Tonia Antoniazzi of the Labour Party became its MP after winning it from Conservative Byron Davies in the 2017 UK general election. Her party had previously represented the seat from 1909 until 2015.

Overview
The constituency was created in 1885 and has had relatively widely varied boundaries. Before 2015 it had elected Labour MPs since 1906, sharing the longest single-party representation with Normanton and Makerfield. It holds approximately a third of the electorate of the city and county of Swansea, the rest of which is Swansea West and Swansea East.

Boundaries

1885–1918: The Municipal Borough of Swansea, and the Sessional Divisions of Gower, Pontardawe, and Swansea.

1918–1950: The Urban District of Oystermouth, and the Rural Districts of Gower and Swansea.

1950–1983: The Urban District of Llwchwr, and the Rural Districts of Gower and Pontardawe.

1983–2010: The City of Swansea wards of Bishopston, Fairwood, Gower, Newton, Oystermouth, Penclawdd, Pennard, and West Cross, and the Borough of Lliw Valley wards of Clydach, Dulais East, Gorseinon Central, Gorseinon East, Gowerton East, Gowerton West, Graigfelin, Kingsbridge, Llangyfelach, Lower Loughor, Mawr, Penllergaer, Penyrheol, Pontardulais, Tal-y-bont, Upper Loughor, and Vardre.

2010–present: The Swansea County electoral divisions of Bishopston, Clydach, Fairwood, Gorseinon, Gower, Gowerton, Kingsbridge, Llangyfelach, Lower Loughor, Mawr, Newton, Oystermouth, Penclawdd, Penllergaer, Pennard, Penyrheol, Pontardulais, Upper Loughor, and West Cross.

The constituency encompasses most of the old Lordship of Gower (less the city of Swansea) and covers the inner Gower Peninsula and outer Gower areas including Clydach, Gowerton, Gorseinon, Felindre and Garnswllt.

History

Liberals and Labour 1885–1918
The first years, seeing more heavy industrial make-up than today, represented a struggle between the Liberals and those who favoured direct labour representation. Although its new electors in 1885 were predominantly the miners and tinplaters of the Swansea Valley, the new MP was Frank Ash Yeo, a local colliery owner and clearly an upper-class figure. In 1885 he comfortably defeated Henry Nathaniel Miers of Ynyspenllwch in the Swansea Valley, a coal owner, tinplate manufacturer and landowner.

On Yeo's death in 1888, representatives of the trade unions in the constituency overturned the Liberal association's choice of Sir Horace Davey and ensured the selection of David Randell as candidate. Randell was a Methodist solicitor who specialised in trade union litigation and his victory, albeit with a reduced majority over John Dillwyn Llewellyn, formed the basis of later claims that Gower was a 'labour' seat.

Modern history
Since 1945, Gower has been a mostly reliable seat for the Labour Party, returning Labour's candidate except in two elections; in the 1983 Conservative landslide, in which it was won by just 1,205 votes, and in 2010, where it was held by 2,683 votes. However, unlike many Welsh valley seats, which have given commanding majorities to Labour, Gower has not seen a majority of over 10,000 votes or 20% of the vote for the Labour candidate in any election (with the exception of 1997) since 1979.  In 2015, incumbent MP Martin Caton stood down, and the new Labour candidate Liz Evans was defeated by the Conservative Byron Davies by 27 votes, less than 0.1% of votes cast, which made it the most marginal Conservative seat going into the next election. Davies' victory brought 105 consecutive years of Labour representation to an end, but Labour won the seat back in the 2017 general election with a majority of 3,269, slightly larger than Caton's final majority in 2010.

Members of Parliament

Elections

Elections in the 19th century

Elections in the 1880s

Elections in the 1890s

Elections in the 20th century

Elections in the 1900s

]

Elections in the 1910s

General Election 1914–15:
A General Election was required to take place before the end of 1915. The political parties had been making preparations for an election to take place, and by July 1914, the following candidates had been selected:
Labour: John Williams
Liberal: 
Unionist: Peter D Thomas

Elections in the 1920s

Elections in the 1930s

Election in the 1940s

Elections in the 1950s

Elections in the 1960s

Elections in the 1970s

Elections in the 1980s

Elections in the 1990s

Elections in the 21st century

Elections in the 2000s

Elections in the 2010s

Of the 57 rejected ballots:
40 were either unmarked or it was uncertain who the vote was for.
17 voted for more than one candidate.

Of the 122 rejected ballots:
90 were either unmarked or it was uncertain who the vote was for.
32 voted for more than one candidate.

See also
 A map of Glamorganshire in 1885, showing its new divisions.
 Gower (Senedd constituency)
 List of parliamentary constituencies in West Glamorgan
 List of parliamentary constituencies in Wales

Notes

References

Sources

External links
Politics Resources (Election results from 1922 onwards)
Electoral Calculus (Election results from 1955 onwards)
2017 Election House of Commons Library 2017 Election report
A Vision Of Britain Through Time (Constituency elector numbers)

Parliamentary constituencies in South Wales
Politics of Swansea
Constituencies of the Parliament of the United Kingdom established in 1885
Gower Peninsula